Krefeld II – Wesel II is an electoral constituency (German: Wahlkreis) represented in the Bundestag. It elects one member via first-past-the-post voting. Under the current constituency numbering system, it is designated as constituency 114. It is located in the Ruhr region of North Rhine-Westphalia, comprising the northern part of the city of Krefeld and the southern part of the district of Wesel.

Krefeld II – Wesel II was created for the 2002 federal election. Since 2021, it has been represented by Jan Dieren of the Social Democratic Party (SPD).

Geography
Krefeld II – Wesel II is located in the Ruhr region of North Rhine-Westphalia. As of the 2021 federal election, it comprises the Stadtbezirke of Nord, Hüls, Mitte, and Ost from the independent city of Krefeld and the municipalities of Moers and Neukirchen-Vluyn from the district of Wesel.

History
Krefeld II – Wesel II was created in 2002 and contained parts of the abolished constituencies of Krefeld and Wesel II. In the 2002 through 2009 elections, it was constituency 115 in the numbering system. Since 2013, it has been number 114.

Members
The constituency was first represented by Siegmund Ehrmann of the Social Democratic Party (SPD) from 2002 to 2017. It was won by Kerstin Radomski of the Christian Democratic Union (CDU) in the 2017 election. Jan Dieren regained it for the SPD in 2021.

Election results

2021 election

2017 election

2013 election

2009 election

References

Federal electoral districts in North Rhine-Westphalia
2002 establishments in Germany
Constituencies established in 2002
Krefeld
Wesel (district)